Unforgettable Love (Chinese: 贺先生的恋恋不忘) is a 2021 Chinese romance television series, starring Wei Zheming, Hu Yixuan, co-starring Sheng Huizi, Yu Yijie, Shi Qingyan, Wu Chongxuan and Sun Sicheng. The series is based on the novel Mr He's Love is Not Forgotten (贺少的闪婚暖妻) by Qin Ye. It revolves around He Qiaoyan, CEO of Heshi Group, and Qin Yiyue, a child psychologist. The series airs on Mango TV from July 10, 2021, and is also available on iQiyi app and iQ.com.

Synopsis 
He Qiaoyan (Wei Zheming), CEO of Heshi Group, and Qin Yiyue (Hu Yixuan), a child psychologist, start a contract marriage for Xiaobao (Sun Sicheng) at the beginning. But the rational, distant, indifferent CEO and the soft, optimistic, considerate, and meticulous psychologist finally fall in love with each other.

Cast

Main 

 Wei Zheming as He Qiaoyan (CEO of Heshi group)
 Hu Yixuan as Qin Yiyue (a child psychologist)

People related to He Qiaoyan 

 Sun Sicheng as He Weifei (Xiaobao)
 Yu Yijie as Wen Gu (He Qiaoyan's best friend)
 Shi Qingyan as Lin Wei
 Lu Yong as Mr. Wen (Wen Gu's father)
 Zhang Ruijia as He Jiaqin (He Qiaoyan's aunt)
 Xu Yanghao as He Qiaonian (He Qiaoyan's elder brother, Xiaobao's biological father)
 Ren Jie as Mrs. Liu

People related to Qin Yiyue 

 Sheng Huizi as Yang Ruowei (Qin Yiyue's best friend)
 Wu Chongxuan as Ning Fang (Qin Yiyue's senior brother)
 Liu Wei as Qin Qiuyang (Qin Yiyue's father)
 Zhang Li as Luo Mingmei (Qin Yiyue's mother)

Heshi Group 

 Xie Xintong as Zhong Peishan (He Qiaoyan's secretary)
 Wang Jinduo as Ma Fada (He Qiaoyan's assistant)

Yade Hospital 

 Zhang Haolun as Zhou Ziyang (Qin Yiyue's ex-boyfriend)
 Pu Yutong as Ye Qing
 Zhan Zitong as Xiao An
 Zhu Guoyu as President Ye
 Zhao Weiguo as Director Huang

Production 
The series began filming in September 2020 in Changsha, China, and wrapped up in November 2020.

References

External links 

 Unforgettable Love on Sina Weibo

2021 Chinese television series debuts
2021 Chinese television series endings
Chinese television series
Chinese drama television series
Mandarin-language television shows
Chinese romance television series
Television shows based on Chinese novels
IQIYI original programming